Zhenxing District is a district of the city of Dandong, Liaoning, People's Republic of China.

Administrative Divisions
There are nine subdistricts and one town in the district.

Subdistricts:
Yongchang Subdistrict, Liudaogou Subdistrict, Toudao Bridge Subdistrict, Xianwei Subdistrict, Linjiang Subdistrict, Huayuan Subdistrict, Zhanqian Subdistrict, Maokuishan Subdistrict, Xicheng Subdistrict

The only town is Tangchi

Education

Eaglebridge International School is in the district.

References

External links

County-level divisions of Liaoning